Mamejor! (まめジャー!) is the second studio album from Japanese girl group Mameshiba no Taigun. It was released on January 20, 2021 by Avex Trax. The album has twelve tracks.

Track listing

Charts

References

2021 albums
Japanese-language albums
Avex Trax albums